Laurence Archer (born 9 November 1961 in London) is a British guitarist and songwriter notable for his work with British rock bands UFO and Phil Lynott's Grand Slam. He wrote many of Grand Slam's songs together with Phil Lynott and Mark Stanway, some of which were released as Thin Lizzy songs. Archer was also a member of British band Wild Horses, Stampede, Lautrec, Medicine Head and Rhode Island Red with Gary Leiderman on bass (ex-Talk Talk, Thin Lizzy), Manolo Antonana on drums and frontman/actor/writer Mike Dyer.

While Archer was in Stampede, the band recorded two albums for Polydor Records: The Official Bootleg and Hurricane Town. Before that, Archer was in Lautrec with his stepfather, singer Reuben Archer.

Stampede re-formed in 2009 in the wake of renewed interest and the CD re-issues of both The Official Bootleg and Hurricane Town via UK-based Rock Candy Records and Universal Music in Japan. The line-up consisted of original members Laurence Archer, Reuben Archer, and Colin Bond, with Steve Graystone replacing Eddie Parsons on drums, and new guitarist Chris Clowsley.

In 2011, Archer also began playing in the band X-UFO, alongside fellow former members of UFO, Danny Peyronel and Clive Edwards, with Rocky Newton (ex-McAuley Schenker Group) on bass.

In May 2016, Mark Stanway announced the reformation of Phil Lynott's Grand Slam together with Laurence Archer, Micky Barker, Neil Murray and Stefan Berggren.

In March 2019, Archer confirmed he was recording new material for Grandslam, with Mike Dyer, David Boyce, Benji Reid and Mark Stanway. On 30 August 2019, BBC Radio 2 played the world premiere of the new Grandslam single "Gone are the Days". Grand Slam’s album, Hit the Ground, was released on 22 November 2019 via Marshall Records.

Discography

w/ Lautrec
 Mean Gasoline EP (1980)

Solo
 LA (1986)
 LA Secret (2019)

w/ Stampede
 Days of Wine and Roses EP (1982)
 The Official Bootleg (1982)
 Hurricane Town (1983)
 The Other Side 7" single (1983)
 A Sudden Impulse (2013)

with UFO
 High Stakes & Dangerous Men (1992)
 Lights Out In Tokyo (1992)

with Phil Lynott's Grand Slam
 Studio Sessions (2002)
 Live 1984 (2003, recorded 1984)
 Twilight's Last Gleaming (2003, recorded 1984)

with Grand Slam
 Hit the Ground  (2019, recorded 2018)

References

Living people
English rock guitarists
English male guitarists
Musicians from London
1961 births
Grand Slam (band) members
UFO (band) members